The 1965 Cork Intermediate Hurling Championship was the 56th staging of the Cork Intermediate Hurling Championship since its establishment by the Cork County Board in 1909.

Glen Rovers won the championship following a 3–08 to 3–05 defeat of Éire Óg in the final. This was their seventh championship title overall and their first title since 1961.

References

Cork Intermediate Hurling Championship
Cork Intermediate Hurling Championship